Ted-Jan Bloemen (born 16 August 1986) is a Dutch-Canadian long track speed skater. He started competing for the Canadian national speed skating team during the 2014–15 season, but before that, he competed for the Netherlands in international competitions. Bloemen primarily competes in long-distance events as well as team pursuit events. He is a former world record holder for the 5,000 m (6:01.86), set in Salt Lake City, and was the Olympic record holder for the 10,000 m (12:39.77), set when he  won gold at the 2018 Winter Olympics in Pyeongchang. Bloemen also won a silver medal in the 5,000 m at the Pyeongchang Olympics, the first Canadian male to medal in the distance since 1932. He has won a silver in 10,000 m and one bronze and silver in the team pursuit at the World Speed Skating Championships.

Career
Bloemen started skating at a young age in his hometown of Gouda. He participated at the 2006 World Junior Speed Skating Championships in Erfurt, where he came in 5th. In the 2007/2008 season, he first participated in the Speed Skating World Cup at the long distances, winning the Team pursuit with the Dutch team. He also reached 4th place at that season's Dutch Allround Championships and 8th place at the 2008 European Speed Skating Championships. The 2009/2010 season was his best up to that point, coming in second at the Dutch Allround and 4th at the World Allround Championships. Following a less successful next season, he retired as a professional skater but still participated in championships as an amateur operating from Friesland. Remarkably, he qualified for the 2012 European (9th place) and World Championships (14th place) and won the National Championships. Though somewhat aided by the absence of Jan Blokhuijsen and Sven Kramer, this was the first time that an amateur won this Dutch National Championships since the introduction of professional skating. He joined the (professional) BAM skating team the next season, but disappointing results (15th at the European Championships) caused his contract not to be extended.

Bloemen moved to Canada to compete for the Canadian national team in the summer of 2014. He won a silver medal as part of the team pursuit with Canada at the 2015 World Single Distance Speed Skating Championships. There Canada's Denny Morrison and teammate said of the team's silver that "With (Bloemen) coming over this summer, it was a new team, and we struggled early on this season. So we had to communicate, find out what our flaws were, correct our flaws, and we had better results... And today, it all came together. This is just the beginning for us on the road to the 2018 Olympics."

He set a world record in the 10,000 metres on 21 November 2015 with a time of 12 minutes 36.30 seconds at an ISU World Cup event. This was more than five seconds faster than the previous mark of 12:41.69 set by Sven Kramer of the Netherlands on 10 March 2007; both men set their times at Salt Lake City's Utah Olympic Oval. After the race he said, "I've dreamt of this record for a long time. It was a perfect race. All through the race, I heard the P.A. announcer and the crowd go wild when they saw my times and realized I was close to a world record. But I was quick to ignore it all, and I was able to refocus on my technique, which was key to having a good race – as well as being consistent, physically and mentally." Two years later, Bloemen also beat the 5,000 m world record, again pipping Kramer to the feat, overcoming the ten-year-old time that Kramer put up with a time of 6:01.86.

The 2018 Winter Olympics took place in Pyeongchang, Korea and there Bloemen competed for Canada in his first Olympics at the age of 31. In the 5,000 m race, his first event, he skated to a silver medal. Trailing his skating partner Sverre Lunde Pedersen on the final lap by nearly a second, Bloemen was able to tie Pedersen in a photo finish. Photo technology later revealed that he had beaten Pedersen by two-thousandths of a second. This was the first medal for Canada in the men's 5,000 m since Willy Logan won bronze in Lake Placid at the 1932 Winter Olympics. In the 10,000 m race, Bloemen won the gold medal to become the first non-Dutch skater to win a speed-skating event at the 2018 Games. He also set the new Olympic Record for that distance. Bloemen finished off the season by winning the annual World Cup 5,000/10,000-metre classification championship.

On February 13, 2020, Bloemen won the gold medal in the 5000 m event at the 2020 World Single Distances Speed Skating Championships skated at the Utah Olympic Oval in Salt Lake City; Canadian teammate Graeme Fish took the bronze. The next day he finished second in the 10,000 m race in which Fish broke Bloemen's 2015 world record to take the gold medal.

Personal
Bloemen's father, Gerhard-Jan Bloemen, is a retired general practitioner in Gouda and has dual Dutch-Canadian citizenship, being born in Bathurst, New Brunswick, a few years before his Dutch parents returned with him to the Netherlands. This made Bloemen also a dual citizen through his Canadian-born father.

Personal records

As of 10 March 2019, Bloemen is in 7th position in the adelskalender with 145.841 points. Between 12 October 2017 and 2 March 2019 he held a personal best 5th place.

Tournament overview

Source:

Medal overview

Career highlights

Winter Olympics
2018 – Pyeongchang,  at Men's 5000m
2018 – Pyeongchang,  at Men's 10000m
World Allround Championships
2010 – Heerenveen, 4th
2016 – Berlin, 5th
2019 – Calgary, 5th
European Allround Championships
2008 – Kolomna, 8th
National Allround Championships
2010 – Heerenveen, 
2012 – Heerenveen, 
World Junior Allround Championships
2006 – Erfurt, 5th
2006 – Erfurt,  1st at team pursuit
European Junior Games
2006 – Collalbo,  1st at team pursuit
2006 – Collalbo,  3rd at 1500 m

References

External links

1986 births
Canadian male speed skaters
Dutch male speed skaters
Dutch emigrants to Canada
People from Leiderdorp 
Sportspeople from Gouda, South Holland 
Speed skaters from Calgary
Living people
Speed skaters at the 2018 Winter Olympics
Speed skaters at the 2022 Winter Olympics
Olympic speed skaters of Canada
Medalists at the 2018 Winter Olympics
Olympic medalists in speed skating
Olympic gold medalists for Canada
Olympic silver medalists for Canada
World Single Distances Speed Skating Championships medalists